David Jeremy Leon (born 24 July 1980) is an English actor, director, writer and producer. As an actor, he is known for appearing in Rankin and Chris Cottam's 2002 feature film, Lives of the Saints (as the character Othello), and director Guy Ritchie's 2008 feature, RocknRolla, as Malcolm.  From 2011 to 2014, Leon co-starred with Brenda Blethyn in the ITV detective series Vera. 

Leon's directorial debut, the 2010 short, Man and Boy, co-directed with Marcus McSweeney, won the award for best narrative short at the Tribeca Film Festival. His next short film, the 2012 Orthodox, an entry in the 58th BFI's London Film Festival, led to his first feature-length film of the same name, which was released in 2015.

Early life and education
Leon was born on 24 July 1980 in Newcastle upon Tyne, England, where his mother, Ann J. Brown, was a secretary and his father, Anthony N. Leon, worked in a power station. He is Jewish on his father's side and describes himself as half-Jewish. He briefly played for Blackburn Rovers F.C. He is a graduate of the National Youth Theatre. He was educated at Dame Allan's School.

Career

Acting and presenting
In 2002, Leon worked as a presenter on CITV. He dropped out of drama school in 2004 to shoot the film Alexander with Oliver Stone in Morocco. From 2004–2005 he acted in 12 epidodes of the TV series, Cutting It, playing the character Troy Gillespie. In 2006, Leon's acting roles included the film These Foolish Things, which also starred Lauren Bacall, Anjelica Huston, Terence Stamp, and Zoë Tapper, and in 2007 he played Billy the Kid in the BBC's mini series The Wild West. In 2010 he played the theatrical role of Jesus in Mark Haddon's play, Polar Bears, at the Donmar Warehouse. 

From 2011 to 2014, he played DS Joe Ashworth in the ITV detective series Vera alongside Brenda Blethyn.

Writing and directing
Leon wrote and co-directed the short film, Father, with Marcus McSweeney, premiering in 2009. The next year, the same team premiered the short, Man and Boy, which was entered in film festivals, including the Tribeca. 

Orthodox, Leon's third short film as writer/director, was accepted into several international festivals including the 58th BFI London Film Festival. The feature-length version of Orthodox was completed in 2015.

Awards and recognition
Leon's and McSweeney's 2010 Man and Boy won the award for the best narrative short at that year's Tribeca Film Festival.

Filmography

As actor in film and television
2004: Alexander as Hermolaous
2004–2005: Cutting It as Troy Gillespie (TV series) - 12 episodes
2005: Boy Eats Girl as Nathan
2006: These Foolish Things as Robin Gardner
2006: The Wild West as Billy the Kid (TV mini-series)
2006: The Lives of the Saints as Othello
2006: Strictly Confidential as Jeff (TV series) - 1 episode
2007: Clapham Junction as Alfie Cartwright (TV one-off Drama)
2008: Love Me Still as Freddie
2008: RocknRolla as Malcolm
2010: Coming Up as Dan (TV series) - 1 episode
2011–2014: Vera as DS Joe Ashworth (TV series) - 16 episodes (Series 1-4)
2012: The Glass House  as Lajos
2013: Walking with the Enemy
2013: Grace and Danger as Cifaretto
2014: The Refugees as Álex
2017: In The Dark BBC TV Drama as DI Adam Perrin
2019: Gold Digger as Kieran

As actor in theatre
2010: Polar Bears as Jesus

As director
2009: Father (short) (co-director with Marcus McSweeney)
2010: Man and Boy (short) (co-director with Marcus McSweeney)
2012: Orthodox (short)
2016: Orthodox (feature)
2017: Vera

As producer
2009: Father (short)
2010: Man and Boy (short)
2012: Orthodox (short)
2016: Orthodox (feature)

References

External links
 

1980 births
Living people
English people of Jewish descent
English male film actors
English male television actors
Male actors from Newcastle upon Tyne
National Youth Theatre members
People educated at Dame Allan's School